This is a collection of ICC Men's T20 World Cup officials who participated in the ICC Men's T20 World Cup. The umpires were selected from the Elite Panel of ICC Umpires and the ICC International umpire panel and the referees from the Panel of ICC Referees.

Match officials

2007 ICC World Twenty20

2009 ICC World Twenty20

2010 ICC World Twenty20

2012 ICC World Twenty20

2014 ICC World Twenty20

2016 ICC World Twenty20

2020 ICC T20 World Cup

2022 ICC T20 World Cup

See also
 ICC Men's T20 World Cup

References

External links

officials